Pucker Up is the second album by American disco act Lipps, Inc with Cynthia Johnson on lead vocals. The album was released in 1980 on Casablanca Records.

The album contains the minor hit "How Long", a cover of the 1974 hit by Ace, reaching number 4 on the U.S. dance chart and number 29 on the U.S. soul singles chart. It was not as successful as the group's previous album.

Track listing

Side one
 "How Long" 5:50
 "Tight Pair" 8:33

Side two
 "Always Lookin'" 4:36
 "The Gossip Song" 3:50
 "There They Are" 3:25
 "Jazzy" 3:57

Charts
Album

Singles

Sales and certifications

Personnel
 Cynthia Johnson - lead vocals

References

Lipps Inc. albums
1980 albums
Casablanca Records albums